Love Life & Pakodi is a 2021 Telugu-language romantic drama film written and directed by Jayanth Gali. The film is produced by Jayanth Gali under the banner Color of My Ink Films and Madhura Sreedhar Reddy on the banner Madhura Entertainment, features Bimal Kartheek Rebba, Sanchitha Poonacha, Krishna Hebbale, Kalajyothi, Anuradha Mallikarjun, Akarsh Raj Bagavatula in pivotal roles. The film released on 12 March 2021.

Plot 
The plot deals with the journey of a couple, Arun and Rheya, whose relationship starts simple and reaches a complicated phase. They face the hurdles and honestly rediscover themselves at every step.

Cast 
 Bimal Kartheek Rebba
 Sanchitha Poonacha
 Krishna Hebbale
 Kalajyothi
 Anuradha Mallikarjun
 Akarsh Raj Bagavatula

Marketing and release 
Rana Daggubati unveiled Love Life And Pakodi trailer on 29 July 2020. Allu Sirish launched the theatrical trailer for this movie on 3 March 2021. The film released exclusively in multiplexes all over Andhra Pradesh, Telangana, Karnataka, Tamil Nadu and the United States.

Soundtrack 

The soundtrack album is composed by Pavan, with lyrics written by Mahesh Poloju. Madhura Audio Company released the complete soundtrack album featuring four tracks.

Reception 
The Times of India critic Thadhagadh Pathi wrote "It makes an attempt to set itself apart from the run of the mill love stories." The Hindu critic Sangeetha Devi Dundoo wrote "Love Life & Pakodi surely knows to find newer things to discuss in the boy meets girl trope." 123Telugu.com wrote "On the whole, Love Life & Pakodi has a decent premise and contemporary story line. The film starts on an impressive note and performance of the lead pair also quite good." Baradwaj Rangan of Film Companion South wrote "The film depicts the doubts and insecurities of a modern relationship while deliberately avoiding the context of other relationships and society." Telangana Today wrote "Love Life & Pakodi is a story of how broken relationships can still find a way to survive."

References

2020s Telugu-language films
Films shot in Hyderabad, India
Indian romantic drama films
Films set in Hyderabad, India
2021 romantic drama films